Parliamentary elections were held in Guatemala in December 1923. The result was a victory for the Liberal Party, which won all 69 seats. Liberal candidates won overwhelming victories in every constituency, a result that the American diplomatic corps described as farcical.

Results

References

Bibliography
Political Handbook of the world, 1928. New York, 1929.

Elections in Guatemala
Guatemala
1923 in Guatemala
Election and referendum articles with incomplete results